The Pains of Being Pure at Heart is the debut studio album by American indie pop band The Pains of Being Pure at Heart. It was released on February 3, 2009 by Slumberland Records. The band recorded the album at Honeyland Studios in Brooklyn. The Pains of Being Pure at Heart was released to generally warm critical reception.

Musical style
The album's sound has been compared to My Bloody Valentine, Ride, The Field Mice, and The Jesus and Mary Chain.

Release
The Pains of Being Pure at Heart was released in the United States on February 3, 2009 by Slumberland Records. In other territories, the album was released by different labels, including Fortuna Pop! in Europe, Lost & Lonesome Recording Co. in Australia, and Fastcut Records in Japan.

Three singles were released from The Pains of Being Pure at Heart: "Everything with You" on October 14, 2008, "Young Adult Friction" on March 31, 2009, and "Come Saturday" on September 8, 2009.

Critical reception

The Pains of Being Pure at Heart received generally positive reviews. On the review aggregation website Metacritic, the album holds a score of 76 out of 100, indicating "generally favorable reviews". NME'''s Nathaniel Cramp praised it as "pure indie-pop to hold close to your heart." Pitchfork accorded the album a "Best New Music" designation, with reviewer Ian Cohen writing that the band had "made a slyly confident debut that mixes sparkling melodies with an undercurrent of sad bastard mopery". David Bevan of The A.V. Club called the band "sensitive and sublime", while Robert Christgau of MSN Music said of them: "Not only do they have a sound, they have tunes, and the words bring both home."

AllMusic critic Tim Sendra was more reserved in his praise, finding that the album would have benefited from "a little more variation from song to song, a little more of [the band's] own sound, or another song or two as compelling as the best stuff here", while concluding: "Settling for impressive is fair enough and good enough for fans of loud, fuzzy, and heartfelt indie noise pop." Maddy Costa of The Guardian concluded that "anyone convinced that the C86 bands represent a nadir of tweeness will hate it – while anyone who thinks that Britpop and dance music ruined indie will fall hopelessly in love." PopMatters Matthew Fiander found the band overly derivative and felt that on the second half of the album, "the melodies sound a little too simple, the vocals almost anemic, and the songs take on a dreary-afternoon trudge."

Pitchfork ranked The Pains of Being Pure at Heart at number 19 on its list of the best albums of 2009, while "Young Adult Friction" placed at number 30 on the website's list of the best tracks of the year. In 2018, Pitchfork listed The Pains of Being Pure at Heart as the 28th best dream pop album.

Track listing

Personnel
Credits are adapted from the album's liner notes.The Pains of Being Pure at Heart Kip Berman – guitar, vocals
 Kurt Feldman – drums
 Alex Naidus – bass
 Peggy Wang – keyboards, vocalsProduction Jon Chaikin – mastering
 Archie Moore – engineering, mixingDesign'''
 Pavla Kopecna – inside photography (CD edition), back cover photography (LP edition)
 Kendra Rutledge – front cover photography

Charts

References

External links
 

2009 debut albums
The Pains of Being Pure at Heart albums
Slumberland Records albums
Fortuna Pop! Records albums